RLC may refer to:

Education
 Redeemer Lutheran College, Queensland, Australia
 Rosseau Lake College, Ontario, Canada

Engineering
 RLC circuit, resonant electronic circuit
 Radio Link Control, air interface protocol

Politics
 Republican Liberty Caucus, US political organization
 Republican Leadership Council, a US political advocacy group

Other uses
 Redfern Legal Centre, NSW, Australia
 Revived Late Cornish, a variety of the Cornish language
 Royal Logistic Corps of the British Army
 Rugby League Conference, Britain
 Ruben Loftus-Cheek, English footballer
 Rlc., the abbreviation for × Rhyncholaeliocattleya, a nothogenus of orchids